FIFA World Cup referees are FIFA international referees who officiate at the FIFA World Cup matches.

World Cup Final match officials

By country
As of the 2018 FIFA World Cup Final, 33 countries have been represented in the officials body of the FIFA World Cup Final.

By confederation

Number of matches
11 matches:

  Ravshan Irmatov (2010, 2014, 2018)

9 matches:

  Néstor Pitana (2014, 2018)

8 matches:

  Joël Quiniou (1986, 1990, 1994)
  Benito Archundia (2006, 2010)
  Jorge Larrionda (2006, 2010)

7 matches:

  John Langenus (1930, 1934, 1938)
  Sandy Griffiths (1950, 1954, 1958)
  Juan Gardeazábal Garay (1958, 1962, 1966)
  Ali Bujsaim (1994, 1998, 2002)
  Carlos Eugênio Simon (2002, 2006, 2010)
  Frank De Bleeckere (2006, 2010)
  Marco Antonio Rodríguez (2006, 2010, 2014)
  Björn Kuipers (2014, 2018)
  César Arturo Ramos (2018, 2022)

6 matches:

  Ivan Eklind (1934, 1938, 1950)
  Arthur Edward Ellis (1950, 1954, 1958)
  Nikolay Latyshev (1958, 1962)
  Jamal Al Sharif (1986, 1990, 1994)
  Arturo Brizio Carter (1994, 1998)
  Gamal Al-Ghandour (1998, 2002)
  Óscar Ruiz (2002, 2006, 2010)
  Roberto Rosetti (2006, 2010)
  Howard Webb (2010, 2014)
  Mark Geiger (2014, 2018)
  Sandro Ricci (2014, 2018)
  Cüneyt Çakır (2014, 2018)
  Alireza Faghani (2018, 2022)

References

 
FIFA World Cup records and statistics
World Cup referees